Johan Jehosefat Lilipaly (2 June 1943 – 22 October 2022), better known as John Lilipaly, was a Dutch politician.

A member of the Labour Party, he served in the House of Representatives from 1986 to 1998.

Lilipaly died from complications from Alzheimer's disease on 22 October 2022, at the age of 79.

References

1943 births
2022 deaths
Labour Party (Netherlands) politicians
Members of the House of Representatives (Netherlands)
People from Saparua
Deaths from Alzheimer's disease